Summit, California may refer to:

 Summit, Santa Cruz County, California
 Altamont, California, formerly known as The Summit
 Beaumont, California, formerly known as Summit or Summit Station

See also
 Summit (disambiguation)
 Summit City, California (disambiguation)
 Summit Station, California (disambiguation)